The United States Senate Committee on Interoceanic Canals was established on December 15, 1899 and terminated on January 2, 1947, when its functions were transferred to the Committee on Interstate and Foreign Commerce. The Committee on Interoceanic Canals succeeded the Select Committee on the Construction of the Nicaragua Canal, 1895-99. The initial focus of this committee was on legislation to authorize the construction of an isthmian canal to connect the Atlantic and Pacific Oceans.

Chairmen of the Committee on Interoceanic Canals 
John T. Morgan (D-AL) 1899-1903
vacant 1903-1904
John H. Mitchell (R-OR) 1905
Joseph H. Millard (R-NE) 1905-190
Alfred B. Kittredge (R-SD) 1907-1909
Frank Flint (R-CA) 1909-1911
Frank B. Brandegee (R-CT) 1911-1913
James A. O'Gorman (D-NY) 1913-1917
John K. Shields (D-TN) 1917-1919
William E. Borah (R-ID) 1919-1922
Walter Edge (R-NJ) 1922-1930
Thomas D. Schall (R-MN) 1930-1933
Thomas P. Gore (D-OK) 1933-1937
Bennett Champ Clark (D-MO) 1937-1945
Tom Stewart (D-TN) 1945-1947

References

See also

Interoceanic Canals
1899 establishments in Washington, D.C.
1947 disestablishments in Washington, D.C.
Canals in the United States
International canals